Andre Christopher Hasanally (born 10 February 2002) is an English professional footballer who plays as a midfielder for Northern Premier League Division One Midlands club St Neots Town.

Hasanally is a product of the Colchester United Academy having been at the Essex club from the age of eleven. He made his professional debut for Colchester in August 2019. He made appearances for Maldon & Tiptree on loan during the 2020–21 season and was loaned to Felixstowe & Walton United in the 2021-22 season.

Career
Born in Waltham Forest, London, Hasanally joined the Academy at Colchester United in 2013 at the age of eleven years old.

Hasanally made his professional debut for Colchester on 3 August 2019, coming on as a substitute for Courtney Senior in the 82nd-minute of Colchester's 1–1 League Two draw with Port Vale.

Hasanally signed his first professional contract on 30 August 2019, agreeing a three-year deal until June 2022.

For the 2020–21 season, Hasanally made appearances on loan for Maldon & Tiptree. He made his debut on 6 October in the Jammers' 1–0 win against Canvey Island.

Having not played all season for Colchester in the 2021–22 season, he was loaned out in February 2022 to Isthmian League North Division side Felixstowe & Walton United on loan until the end of the campaign, helping the club into the play-off semi-finals. He was released by Colchester at the end of the season.

On 22 July 2022, Hasanally joined Northern Premier League Division One Midlands club St Neots Town.

Career statistics

References

External links
Profile at the Colchester United F.C. website

2002 births
Living people
Footballers from the London Borough of Waltham Forest
English footballers
Association football midfielders
Colchester United F.C. players
Maldon & Tiptree F.C. players
Felixstowe & Walton United F.C. players
St Neots Town F.C. players
English Football League players
Isthmian League players